Kuchuk may refer to:

People
Al-Ashraf Kujuk (1334 – 1345) 
Kuchuk Hanem (1850 – 1870)
Küchük Muhammad (1391 – 1459)
Leonid Kuchuk (b. 1959)
Kučuk-Alija (1801 – 1804)
Aliaksei Kuchuk (b. 1986)
Kuchuk Ahmad Pasha (d. 1636)

Places
Kuchuk, Altai Krai, a rural locality in Altai Krai, Russia
Lake Kuchuk, Altai Krai, Russia
Kuchuk (river), Altai Krai, Russia
Kuchuk Checmedje, a suburb of Istambul, Turkey
Nizhny Kuchuk, a rural locality in Altai Krai, Russia
Stepnoy Kuchuk, a rural locality in Altai Krai, Russia
Tat-Kuchuk, a rural locality in Bashkortostan, Russia 
Verkh-Kuchuk, a rural locality in Altai Krai, Russia

ru:Кучук